The Great Altar of Unconquered Hercules stood in the Forum Boarium of ancient Rome. It was the earliest cult-centre of Hercules in Rome, predating the circular Temple of Hercules Victor. Roman tradition made the spot the site where Hercules slew Cacus and ascribed to Evander of Pallene its erection.  Virgil's Aeneid tells of Evander attributing the original creation of the Ara Maxima to Potitius and the Pinarii.

The original altar burned in the Great Fire of Rome, 64 CE, but was rebuilt and still stood in the fourth century. A tentative identification of a tufa platform in the crypt of Santa Maria in Cosmedin with the foundation of the altar has been made by Filippo Coarelli and other archaeologists.

Various references, with Varro as their source, justified the exclusion of women from ceremonies here, or of partaking in the sacrificial meats. The rites at the Ara Maxima were unique within the cult of Hercules in that they were performed ritu Graeco, with heads uncovered.

See also
List of Ancient Roman temples
List of ancient monuments in Rome

References

External links 
Samuel Ball Platner and Thomas Ashby, A Topographical Dictionary of Ancient Rome 1929

Hercules
Rome R. XII Ripa
Temples of Heracles